This page lists the World Best Year Performance in the year 2002 in both the men's and the women's race walking distances: 20 km and 50 km (outdoor). One of the main events during this season were the 2002 European Athletics Championships in Munich, Germany. The world record was broken in 2002 in both the men's 20 km and 50 km race walk.

Abbreviations
All times shown are in hours:minutes:seconds

Men's 20 km

Records

2002 World Year Ranking

Men's 50 km

Records

2002 World Year Ranking

Women's 20 km

Records

2002 World Year Ranking

References
IAAF
Women's 20 km Year Ranking

2002
Race Walking Year Ranking, 2002